Sphingomonas changbaiensis  is a Gram-negative and rod-shaped bacteria from the genus of Sphingomonas which has been isolated from forest soil from the Changbai Mountains in the Heilongjiang Province in China.

References

Further reading

External links
Type strain of Sphingomonas changbaiensis at BacDive -  the Bacterial Diversity Metadatabase

changbaiensis
Bacteria described in 2010